Megasoma gyas is a species of large Neotropical rhinoceros beetles. There are no recognized subspecies.

Description
Megasoma gyas have setae all over their bodies. Males have three thoracic horns and one cephalic horn. Females are without horns.

References

External links
 

Dynastinae
Beetles described in 1785
Beetles of South America